was a province of Japan comprising modern-day Yamagata Prefecture and Akita Prefecture, except for the city of Kazuno and the town of Kosaka. Dewa bordered on Mutsu and Echigō Provinces.

History

Early period
Prior to the Asuka period, Dewa was inhabited by Ainu or Emishi tribes, and was effectively outside of the control of the Yamato dynasty. Abe no Hirafu conquered the native Emishi tribes at what are now the cities of Akita and Noshiro in 658 and established a fort on the Mogami River. In 708 AD  was created within Echigō Province. The area of Dewa District was roughly that of the modern Shōnai area of Yamagata Prefecture, and was gradually extended to the north as the Japanese pushed back the indigenous people of northern Honshū. Dewa District was promoted to the status of a province in 712 AD, and gained Okitama and Mogami Districts, formerly part of Mutsu Province.

A number of military expeditions were sent to the area, with armed colonists forming settlements with wooden palisades across central Dewa in what is now the Shōnai area of Yamagata Prefecture. The capital of the new province was initially established at Dewanosaku (出羽柵), a fortified settlement in what is now part of Sakata, Yamagata, which served as a vital military stronghold in the expansion of Yamato control and settlement in the region. In 733, the capital was moved north, and a new military settlement, later named “Akita Castle”, was built what is now in the Takashimizu area of the city of Akita. Abe no Yakamaro was sent as Chinjufu-shōgun. In 737, a major military operation began to connect Akita Castle with Taga Castle on the Pacific Coast. Over the next 50 years, additional fortifications were erected at Okachi in Dewa Province and Monofu in Mutsu Province involving a force of over 5000 men. The road was greatly resented by the Emishi tribes, and after an uprising in 767, pacification expeditions were carried out in 776, 778, 794, 801 and 811.

During the Nara period, under the Engishiki classification system, Dewa was ranked as a "greater country" (上国). Under the ritsuryō system, Dewa was classed as a “far country” (遠国). The name of the province was originally pronounced “Idewa”. The Ichinomiya of Dewa Province was the Chōkaisan Omonoimi Jinja in what is now Yuza, Yamagata.

During the Heian period, in 878, a major rebellion known as the  erupted in the region against Yamato rule. Another major uprising occurred in 939, as part of East Japan war Tengyō no Ran. Towards the end of the Heian period, the province was organized into eleven districts. It was later a battleground in the Gosannen War and the Former Nine Years War.

Medieval period
Following the destruction of the Northern Fujiwara clan by the forces of the Kamakura shogunate in 1189, many Fujiwara partisans fled to the mountains of Dewa and continued to resist central authority. The area was divided into numerous shōen during the Kamakura period, which developed into the centers of numerous rival samurai clans. In 1335, Shiba Kaneyori received the Dewa Province as a fief from Ashikaga Takauji, but ruled it only in name. By the end of the Sengoku period, the Mogami clan had emerged as the strongest local force in the southern portion of the province, whereas the Akita clan dominated the northern portion of the province. Both clans sided with Tokugawa Ieyasu at the Battle of Sekigahara, and were thus secured in their holdings at the start of the Tokugawa shogunate.

Early modern period
During the early Edo period, both the Mogami and the Akita were dispossessed, and their territories broken up into smaller domains, the largest of which were held by the Sakai clan and Uesugi clans. During the Bakumatsu period, all of the domains in the area joined the Ōuetsu Reppan Dōmei supporting the Tokugawa shogunate.

Historical districts
 Ugo Province
 Akumi District (飽海郡)
 Akita District (秋田郡)
 Hiraka District (平鹿郡) 
 Kawabe District (河辺郡) 
 Ogachi District (雄勝郡)
 Semboku District (仙北郡)
 Yamamoto District (山本郡)
 Yuri District (由利郡) 
Uzen Province
 Tagawa District (田川郡) (former Dewa District (出羽郡))
 Kubiki District (櫛引郡)
 Mogami District (最上郡)
 Murayama District (村山郡)
 Okitama District (置賜郡)

Bakumatsu period domains

Highways
Ushū Kaidō – a subroute of the Ōshū Kaidō and Sendaidō with 57 post stations connecting what is now Koori, Fukushima with Aomori
Yonezawa Kaidō – connecting what is now Aizuwakamatsu, Fukushima with Yamagata.
Sendai Kaidō – connecting what is now Sakata, Yamagata with Sendai.
Ushū Hamakaidō – connecting Sakata with Niigata.

Notes

References
 Kōdansha. (1993). Japan: an Illustrated Encyclopedia. Tokyo: Kōdansha;  OCLC 193352222
 Nussbaum, Louis-Frédéric and Käthe Roth. (2005).  Japan encyclopedia. Cambridge: Harvard University Press. ;  OCLC 58053128
 Terry, Thomas Philip. (1914). Terry's Japanese Empire: including Korea and Formosa, with Chapters on Manchuria, the Trans-Siberian Railway, and the Chief Ocean Routes to Japan: a Guidebook for Travelers. New York: Houghton Mifflin. OCLC 123254449
 Titsingh, Isaac. (1834).  Annales des empereurs du Japon (Nihon Odai Ichiran).  Paris: Royal Asiatic Society, Oriental Translation Fund of Great Britain and Ireland. OCLC 5850691.

External links 

  Murdoch's map of provinces, 1903

 
Former provinces of Japan
History of Akita Prefecture
History of Yamagata Prefecture
1868 disestablishments in Japan
States and territories established in the 700s
708 establishments
States and territories disestablished in 1868